Moises Tablante (born 4 July 2001) is a Venezuelan professional footballer who plays as a midfielder for Orlando City B in MLS Next Pro.

Career 
A member of Orlando City's Club Development Academy system since 2017, Tablante made 51 appearances in two seasons with the academy.

In February 2019, Tablante signed an academy contract with Orlando City's USL League One affiliate Orlando City B ahead of the 2019 season. He scored his first goal for the team on 17 May 2019 in a 2–0 win over Toronto FC II. Tablante returned for the 2020 season, registering two assists in Orlando's first win of the year, a 2–0 win over New England Revolution II on 7 August 2020.

Career statistics 
As of 24 September 2022

References

External links 
 
 

2001 births
Living people
Venezuelan footballers
Venezuelan expatriate footballers
Venezuelan expatriate sportspeople in the United States
Association football midfielders
Expatriate soccer players in the United States
Orlando City B players
Soccer players from Florida
USL League One players
MLS Next Pro players
Sportspeople from Valencia, Venezuela
21st-century Venezuelan people